Mathieu Reverdin (born 22 July 1987 in Gleizé, France) is a former professional ice hockey player.

Career 
Reverdin made his professional debut for CSG Strasbourg in 2005 after one year with Geneva's Servette junior squad. He played two years in Strasbourg before moving to the Lyon Hockey Club in 2007. In 2009, he signed for Briançon Diables Rouges in Ligue Magnus. In 2010, he came back to the Lyon Hockey Club. He retired from hockey after the 2010-11 season.

Playing style 

Reverdin is tall but light at only 187 cm and 82 kg and he plays right-handed.

External links 
 Lyon Hockey Club

French ice hockey players
1987 births
Living people
Diables Rouges de Briançon players